Rodney County may refer to:
 Rodney County, New Zealand
 Rodney County, Victoria, Australia